The Vendetta Tapes is a 2015 album of incidental music from the 1960s BBC television series Vendetta. It also includes other pieces from the BBC Radiophonic Workshop library that would not fit on The John Baker Tapes (tracks 22–36). It was mastered by Mark Ayres.

Track listing

References

Bibliography

External links

BBC Radiophonic Workshop albums
2015 albums